Razeni may refer to:
Răzeni, Moldova
Razeni, Iran